Oswald Antoine Marie d'Andréa is a French pianist and composer of music for film, television and radio. He was born on August 9, 1934 in Tunis.

His recorded output varied from pop in the early '60s to jazz and movie soundtracks, one of which—La Vie et Rien d'Autre—won the 1990 César for Best Music.

Discography
196? : Un Premier Amour EP (with Le 4 de Coeur) (Polydor)
1964 : Tokyo 64 (Olympic Disc) (Polydor)
1967 : Starting-Music Auto (Polydor)
1968 :  Les Indicatifs de RTL Non Stop EP (Moshé-Naïm)
1969 : Concerto pour Commencer un Concert (Moshé-Naïm) (reissued on CD as Pièces Concertantes pour Piano)
1969 : Galaxie EP (Moshé-Naïm)
1970 : 12 Divertissements pour Piano (Moshé-Naïm)
1970 : Major Barbara EP (Disques Jacques Canetti)
1971 : Le Temps: 0-12-24 (Moshé-Naïm)
1973 : Le Temps: Les 12 Signes du Zodiaque (Moshé-Naïm)
1977 : Musiques Originales des Films Imaginaires (Moshé-Naïm)
1977 : Piano-Formes (Moshé-Naïm)
198? : Brecht Konzert (with Nicole d'Andréa) (Moshé-Naïm)
1989 : La Vie et Rien d'Autre soundtrack (Polydor)
1995 : Deux Pianos sur Scène (with Nicole d'Andréa) (Moshé-Naïm/Musidisc)
1996 : Capitaine Conan soundtrack (Sony Music (France))
2001 : The Sound of Time (Moshé-Naïm/Emen)

References

French film score composers
20th-century French male classical pianists
French male conductors (music)
French music arrangers
French male film score composers
Male television composers
Polydor Records artists
Sony Music artists
1934 births
Living people
Tunisian emigrants to France